The 2010 Dominion Curling Club Championship was held November 23–28 at the Charlottetown and Cornwall Curling Clubs in Charlottetown and Cornwall, Prince Edward Island.

It is the second incarnation of this event.

Saskatchewan's Sutherland Curling Club won the men's event, having to win four straight games in the process after finishing the pool round in a three-way tie for second place at a 4–2 record. They defeated Ontario in the final, a team that had been undefeated until that point (including a pool victory over Saskatchewan).

Alberta's Lethbridge Curling Club won the women's event over Saskatchewan.

Men's event

Grey pool

Blue pool

Tiebreakers
  8-4 
  6-2 
  9-6

Playoffs

Women's event

Grey pool

Blue pool

Tiebreaker
  6-4

Playoffs

External links
 Official site

Dominion Curling Club Championships, 2010
Curling competitions in Charlottetown
Curling competitions in Prince Edward Island
2010 in Prince Edward Island
Canadian Curling Club Championships
November 2010 sports events in Canada